The Southwark and Vauxhall Waterworks Company was a utility company supplying water to parts of south London in England. The company was formed by the merger of the Southwark and Vauxhall water companies in 1845 and became part of the publicly owned Metropolitan Water Board in 1904.

Origins

Southwark Water Company
The Borough Waterworks Company was formed in 1770, originally supplying water to a brewery and the surrounding area, which spanned the distance between London and Southwark Bridges. The adjacent area was supplied by the London Bridge Waterworks Company. London Bridge Waterworks was dissolved in 1822, and its water supply licence was purchased by the New River Company. The Borough Waterworks Company purchased the licence from the New River Company later that same year, and it was renamed the Southwark Water Company. The company extracted water from the River Thames using steam engines to pump it to a cistern at the top of a  tower.

Vauxhall Water Company
The South London Waterworks Company was established by private act of parliament in 1805. The company extracted water from the Thames beside Vauxhall Bridge. In 1833 the company supplied 12,046 houses with approximately 12,000 gallons of water. In 1834, the company was renamed the Vauxhall Water Company.

Amalgamation
On 10 January 1845 the two companies submitted a memorial to the Health of Towns Commissioners proposing amalgamation. The memorial noted that since 1834 competition had increased between Southwark, Vauxhall, and Lambeth Water Companies and that the "results of that competition were as inconvenient to the public as they were disastrous to the companies, and afforded the very strongest illustration of the truth of the doctrine... that the principle of competition cannot with advantage be applied to the operations of water companies." The effect of competition on the companies was described as "an immense expenditure of capital in utter waste - double or treble sets of mains and pipes being laid down in districts where one set would better have served the inhabitants. An enormous annual outlay, equally in utter waste, in the salaries of canvassers and commission to agents, who procured tenants; in the bills of plumbers, who changed the service pipes of the tenants from one set of mains to another; in the charges of taking up and relaying roads and pavements on the like occasions; in double and treble sets of turncocks and pipe-layers; and, as the climax of absurdity, a payment of all parochial and district rates in every parish on all the pipes of all the companies, in proportion to the capital expended on assumed profits or interest, which it is needless to say had no existence."

The bill promoted by the two companies successfully passed through parliament, and the Southwark and Vauxhall Waterworks Company formed later that year. The area supplied by the SVWC was centred on the Borough of Southwark, reaching east to Rotherhithe, south to Camberwell and in the west including Battersea and parts of Clapham and Lambeth.

Infrastructure

The amalgamated company established waterworks at Battersea Fields with two depositing reservoirs with a capacity of 32 million gallons; and two filtering reservoirs holding 11 million gallons. In 1850 the company's water was described by the microbiologist Arthur Hassall as "the most disgusting which I have ever examined".

The Metropolis Water Act 1852 was enacted "to make provision for securing the supply to the Metropolis of pure and wholesome water". Under the Act, it became unlawful for any water company to extract water for domestic use from the tidal reaches of the Thames after 31 August 1855, and from 31 December 1855 all such water was required to be "effectually filtered". In the meantime, an outbreak of cholera in 1854 led to the deaths of an estimated 4,267 people supplied by the company.

To comply with the legislation, the Southwark and Vauxhall Company built new waterworks in Hampton between Molesey and Sunbury Locks in 1855. The site was shared in a joint venture with the Grand Junction Waterworks Company and the West Middlesex Waterworks Company. The company also constructed the Stain Hill Reservoirs and a  direct water main to Battersea, its main network of smaller mains spreading out along the route.  A third reservoir was opened later in the year between Nunhead Cemetery and Peckham Rye.

Notwithstanding this, in 1878 from contamination or low-quality filtration, this water company had substantially the worst quality of water.  This may in part have been due to less used, uncovered filter beds in Battersea which were soon after 1900 made defunct.  Dr. Frankland's analysis of water supplied to London during the month of October 1876 gave a relative degree of organic impurity compared to a given volume of the Kent Company's water.  He also compared the samples from those of August and September.  Organic impurity was measured relative to the Kent Water Company's benchmark, who supplied part of London (in areas, in direct competition with the others).  The figures were:

The water delivered by the latter five companies, drawing their supply exclusively from the Thames, when compared with that supplied in August and September, showed a marked deterioration in quality.  It had a higher proportion of contamination with organic matter.  The sample of the Southwark Company's water was poorest: "slightly turbid from insufficient filtration, and contained moving organisms".

By 1903 the SVWC supplied a population of 860,173 in 128,871 houses of which 122,728 (95.3%) had a constant supply.

See also
London water supply infrastructure

References

London water infrastructure
Companies established in 1845
Former water company predecessors of Thames Water
1845 establishments in England